Yichun Airport may refer to:

Yichun Lindu Airport, serving Yichun, Heilongjiang, China
Yichun Mingyueshan Airport, serving Yichun, Jiangxi, China